Anton Stevens (ca. 1608 – perhaps 1675) was a Bohemian painter active in the second third of the 17th century. Besides Karel Škréta he was another important promoter of early Baroque painting in the country.

Life
Anton Stevens, born in Prague, mastered the basics of the painting craft with his father, the Rudolfine landscape painter Pieter Stevens (perhaps 1567 – after 1626), who had settled in the city by 1590. In 1629–1635, the young Stevens made a study trip abroad (probably Spanish Netherlands and Germany; in 1635, he was again in Prague, where the Augustinian Hermits at St. Thomas Church in Lesser Town (Malá Strana) became his first clients. Soon afterward, he portrayed Emperor Ferdinand III and in 1640 he was in Vienna, where Prince Gundaker of Liechtenstein tried to win his services. In 1643, he was ennobled by Count Jaroslav Bořita of Martinice, who granted him the predicate von Steinfels and a family coat-of-arms.

Career
His work is extensive, he painted for a long time for the Strahov Monastery and it is the creator of a number of altarpieces in Prague churches and in the countryside (Augustinian Hermit's monastery in Bělá pod Bezdězem, the dean church in Žatec), also portraits, landscape paintings, murals as well as designs of these prints. He was a member of Prague Old Town's painters' guild and for a certain time was the head of its branch in Lesser Town. Stevens drew inspiration from Flemish painting, explicit responses to the work of Peter Paul Rubens are discernible in his figural style; graphic reproductions of masterpieces by prominent Flemish and Italian artists play an important role in his compositions. In the production of his two sons, Paul Anton and Johann Jakob (1651–1730), the painting dynasty, coming from Mechelen in Belgium, continued into a fourth generation.

Gallery

References

Bibliography
Štěpán Vácha and Radka Heisslerová, Ve stínu Karla Škréty. Pražští malíři v letech 1635–1680. Antonín Stevens, Jan Bedřich Hess, Matěj Zimprecht [= In the Shadow of Karel Škréta. Prague Painters in 1635–1680. Anton Stevens, Johann Friedrich Hess, Matthias Zimprecht]. Prague: Academia, 2017. 

Štěpán Vácha: Der Prager Maler Anton Stevens im Dienst des Fürsten Gundaker von Liechtenstein. In: Die Liechtenstein und die Kunst, ed. by Liechtensteinisch-Tschechische Historikerkomission (= Veröffentlichungen der Liechtensteinisch-Tschechischen Historikerkomission 3), Vaduz: hvfl, 2014, pp. 185–200. 

Štěpán Vácha: Karel Škréta and Anton Stevens. In: Lenka Stolárová – Vít Vlnas (eds.), Karel Škréta (1610–1674): His Work and His Era (Exh. Cat.), National Gallery in Prague, 2010, pp. 453–473.

External links

1608 births
1675 deaths
17th-century Bohemian people
17th-century Flemish painters
Baroque painters
Czech painters
Czech male painters
Czech baroque painters
Artists from Prague